Ratnovce is a village and municipality in Piešťany District in the Trnava Region of western Slovakia.

History
In historical records the village was first mentioned in 1240. The Roman Catholic church of st. Margita Antioch was built there in 1320 and it is still present. The lower part of the tower and the perimeter wall of the church are dated to the 13th century. The tower was rebuilt by Andrej Škrabal and his brother Štefan in 1659. Andrej Škrabal is buried in the church interior under a stone slab that dates back to 1700.

Geography
The municipality lies at an altitude of 198 metres and covers an area of 8.456 km². It has a population of about 1068 people.

References

External links

  Official page
http://www.statistics.sk/mosmis/eng/run.html

Villages and municipalities in Piešťany District